The 2008 ASB Classic was a women's tennis tournament played on outdoor hard courts. It was the 23rd edition of the ASB Classic, and was part of the Tier IV Series of the 2008 WTA Tour. It took place at the ASB Tennis Centre in Auckland, New Zealand, from 31 December 2007 through 5 January 2008.

Finals

Singles

 Lindsay Davenport defeated  Aravane Rezaï, 6–2, 6–2
It was Lindsay Davenport's 1st title of the year, and her 54th overall.

Doubles

 Mariya Koryttseva /  Lilia Osterloh defeated  Martina Müller /  Barbora Záhlavová-Strýcová, 6–3, 6–4

See also
 2008 Heineken Open – men's tournament

External links
Official website
Singles, Doubles and Qualifying Singles Draws

ASB Classic
ASB
WTA Auckland Open
ASB
ASB
2008 in New Zealand tennis